Orthocomotis marmorobrunnea is a species of moth of the family Tortricidae. It is found in Ecuador (Morona-Santiago Province, Pichincha Province and Napo Province).

The ground colour of the forewings is whitish cream, forming slender margins along the markings with grey, ochreous greenish and green suffusions. The hindwings are brownish cream, strongly suffused and diffusely strigulated with brownish grey.

Etymology
The species name refers to the brown, marble-like marking.

References

External links

Moths described in 2006
Endemic fauna of Ecuador
Orthocomotis
Moths of South America
Taxa named by Józef Razowski